Ivona Krmelová (born 29 October 1969) is a Czech former gymnast. She competed in six events at the 1988 Summer Olympics.

References

External links
 

1969 births
Living people
Czech female artistic gymnasts
Olympic gymnasts of Czechoslovakia
Gymnasts at the 1988 Summer Olympics
People from Bohumín
Sportspeople from the Moravian-Silesian Region